Shyam Selvadurai (born 12 February 1965) is a Sri Lankan Canadian novelist. He is most noted for his 1994 novel Funny Boy, which won the Books in Canada First Novel Award and the Lambda Literary Award for Gay Fiction.

Background
Selvadurai was born in Colombo, Sri Lanka to a Sinhalese mother and a Tamil father—members of conflicting ethnic groups whose troubles form a major theme in his work. Ethnic riots in 1983 drove the family to emigrate to Canada when Selvadurai was nineteen. He studied creative and professional writing as part of a Bachelor of Fine Arts program at York University. Selvadurai recounted an account of the discomfort he and his partner experienced during a period spent in Sri Lanka in 1997 in his essay "Coming Out" in Time Asia's special issue on the Asian diaspora in 2003.

Writing career
Selvadurai published Funny Boy in 1994, and followed up in 1998 with the novel Cinnamon Gardens.

In 2004, Selvadurai edited a collection of short stories: Story-Wallah: Short Fiction from South Asian Writers, which includes works by Salman Rushdie, Monica Ali, and Hanif Kureishi, among others. He published a young adult novel, Swimming in the Monsoon Sea, in 2005. Swimming won the Lambda Literary Award in the Children's and Youth Literature category in 2006. He was a contributor to TOK: Writing the New Toronto, Book 1.

In 2013, he released a fourth novel, The Hungry Ghosts. In 2013 Selvadurai's Funny Boy was included in the syllabus under marginalized study and gay literature of the under graduate English Department of The American College in Madurai. In 2014, he was presented the Bonham Centre Award from The Mark S. Bonham Centre for Sexual Diversity Studies, University of Toronto, for his contributions to the advancement and education of issues around sexual identification.

In 2020, Deepa Mehta released the film Funny Boy, an adaptation of Selvadurai's novel. At the 9th Canadian Screen Awards in 2021, Mehta and Selvadurai won the award for Best Adapted Screenplay.

Personal life
He currently lives in Toronto with his partner Andrew Champion.

In 2016, a species of spider was named after Selvadurai called Brignolia Shyami, a small goblin spider which is a pale yellow colour and between 1.4mm and 1.5mm in length.

Bibliography
Funny Boy. Toronto: McClelland and Stewart, 1994.  (and others). Lambda Literary Award for Best Gay Male Novel, and Smithbooks/Books in Canada First Novel Award for 1994
Cinnamon Gardens. Toronto: McClelland and Stewart, 1998. 
Swimming in the Monsoon Sea. Toronto: Tundra, 2005.  Lambda Literary Award in the Children's and Youth Literature category in 2006
Story-Wallah: Short Fiction from South Asian Writers. New York: Houghton Mifflin, 2005.  (editor)
Swimming in the Monsoon Sea. Toronto: Tundra Books, 2005.   
The Hungry Ghosts. Toronto: Doubleday Canada, 2013. 
Many Roads Through Paradise: An Anthology Of Sri Lankan Literature. London: Penguin Books Limited, 2014.  (compiler and translator)
Mansions of the Moon. 2022.

References

External links
 
 

1965 births
Canadian male novelists
Canadian gay writers
Lambda Literary Award for Gay Fiction winners
Lambda Literary Award for Children's and Young Adult Literature winners
Living people
Writers from Toronto
People from Colombo
Canadian people of Sri Lankan Tamil descent
Sri Lankan emigrants to Canada
Sri Lankan novelists
Canadian writers of Asian descent
Sri Lankan LGBT people
Sri Lankan Tamil writers
Sinhalese writers
Canadian LGBT novelists
Applicants for refugee status in Canada
Kala Keerthi
20th-century Canadian novelists
21st-century Canadian novelists
20th-century Canadian male writers
21st-century Canadian male writers
Canadian children's writers
Sri Lankan children's writers
Best Screenplay Genie and Canadian Screen Award winners
Canadian LGBT screenwriters
Amazon.ca First Novel Award winners
21st-century Canadian screenwriters
Gay screenwriters
Canadian male screenwriters
Gay novelists
21st-century Canadian LGBT people
20th-century Canadian LGBT people